Hadfield may refer to:

Places
 Hadfield, Victoria, Australia, a suburb of Melbourne
 Hadfield, Derbyshire, England, a town

Other uses
 Hadfield (surname)
 Hadfields Limited, British steel manufacturer
 Hadfield steel, an alloy
 14143 Hadfield, asteroid
 Hadfield railway station, Hadfield, Derbyshire
 Hadfield railway station, New Zealand